Dame Philippa Jill Olivier Harris  (born 27 March 1967) is a British film and television producer/executive. She co-founded Neal Street Productions in 2003 with Sam Mendes and Caro Newling.

Harris was a script editor at ITV and Channel Four before becoming a development executive at BBC Films and then an executive producer for BBC Drama Serials. In that role her projects included Warriors and Love in a Cold Climate. Harris became Head of Drama Commissioning for the BBC in 2001. Commissions during her time there included Daniel Deronda and The Lost Prince.

Harris has executive produced several films including Things We Lost in the Fire and Revolutionary Road starring Leonardo DiCaprio and Kate Winslet. For TV Harris produced Stuart: A Life Backwards featuring Tom Hardy and Benedict Cumberbatch and executive produced Call the Midwife, Penny Dreadful and The Hollow Crown and Britannia. Harris served as Adviser to the former leader of the Liberal Democrats Nick Clegg MP, with whom she had studied at Robinson College, Cambridge.

For the film 1917 directed by Sam Mendes, Harris received various accolades, including an Academy Award for Best Picture nomination, two BAFTA Awards and a Golden Globe Award.

In 2018, Harris was appointed Chair of BAFTA, after a year as the Deputy Chair and is a board member of the Royal Central School of Speech and Drama.

Early years 
Harris is the granddaughter of medical doctor Noël Olivier. She was educated at Oxford High School for Girls and Robinson College, Cambridge, where she graduated with a degree in English in 1989.

Career 
Pippa Harris started her career as a production assistant at Jacaranda Productions in 1989 and progressed quickly through roles as a script editor for ITV and Channel 4 before becoming development executive at BBC Films. She was then promoted to Executive Producer, BBC Drama Serials. Harris worked on Warriors (1999), Care (2000), The Sleeper (2000) The Way We Live Now (2001) and Love in a Cold Climate (2001).

In 2001, Harris became Head of Drama Commissioning for the BBC, working with Jane Tranter. Her BBC commissions included Cutting It (2002), Flesh and Blood (2002), Daniel Deronda (2002), The Lost Prince (2003) and State of Play (2003).

In 2003, Pippa Harris co-founded Neal Street Productions with partners Sam Mendes and Caro Newling. Since forming the company, Harris has produced several films, including Jarhead (2005), Starter for 10 (2006) and Blood (2012). She has executive produced Things We Lost in the Fire (2007), Revolutionary Road (2008) and Away We Go (2009).

For television, Harris has produced Stuart: A Life Backwards (2007) as well as the frightening psychological thriller, Penny Dreadful created and written by John Logan for Showtime / Sky Atlantic. She also executively produced the critically acclaimed, BAFTA nominated Shakespeare film series, The Hollow Crown (2012) and The Hollow Crown: The War of the Roses (2016), as well as Britannia (2018) which was the first co-production between Sky and Amazon Prime Video in 2018, starring Kelly Reilly, David Morrissey, Zoë Wanamaker, Liana Cornell and Stanley Weber.

Harris continues to executive produce the hugely successful, BAFTA- and NTA-winning Call the Midwife which has returned for a ninth season in 2020.

She is the editor of her grandmother's correspondence with poet Rupert Brooke between 1908 and 1915.

Damehood
Harris was elevated to a Dame Commander of the Order of the British Empire (DBE) in the 2015 Dissolution Honours Lists on 27 August 2015.

Board memberships 
Pippa Harris is Chair of BAFTA, and sits on their board as well after having previously chaired the film committee. Since 2021, Pippa Harris has been Chair of Trustees at Charleston.

She is also a governor of Central School of Speech and Drama, and a Trustee of the Creative Society.

Accolades 
Academy Award for Best Picture nomination for 1917
BAFTA Award for Best Film for 1917
BAFTA Award for Outstanding British Film for 1917
Golden Globe Award for Best Motion Picture – Drama for 1917
Producers Guild Award for Outstanding Producer of Theatrical Motion Pictures for 1917

References

Bibliography 
  Full text on Internet Archive

External links
 
 Interview in The Guardian, UK

1967 births
Alumni of Robinson College, Cambridge
British film producers
British television producers
British women television producers
Dames Commander of the Order of the British Empire
Filmmakers who won the Best Film BAFTA Award
Golden Globe Award-winning producers
Living people
Place of birth missing (living people)